Ken Reichel (born 19 December 1986) is a German professional footballer who plays as a defender. He is currently without a club.

Career
Reichel started out with TSV Rudow and SV Tasmania-Gropiusstadt 1973 in his hometown of Berlin, before moving to the reserve side of Hamburger SV in January 2005.

After two years in Hamburg, where he did not make it into HSV's first team, he joined Eintracht Braunschweig in 2007 and over the years became one of the key players there. With Braunschweig, Reichel played in the Regionalliga Nord, the 3. Liga, the 2. Bundesliga and the Bundesliga. In July 2017, he was named captain of the team. In June 2018, following Braunschweig's relegation to the 3. Liga, it was announced that Reichel had rejected the club's contract offer and that he would leave after more than decade at the club. 

Shortly after leaving Braunschweig, Reichel joined 1. FC Union Berlin signing a two-year contract.

Career statistics

Notes

References

External links
 
 

1986 births
Living people
Footballers from Berlin
Association football defenders
German footballers
Eintracht Braunschweig players
Hamburger SV II players
1. FC Union Berlin players
VfL Osnabrück players
Bundesliga players
2. Bundesliga players
3. Liga players
Regionalliga players